Hideya Matsumoto(英也, 松本) is a Japanese mathematician who works on algebraic groups, who proved Matsumoto's theorem about Coxeter groups and Matsumoto's theorem calculating the second K-group of a field.

Publications

References

20th-century Japanese mathematicians
Living people
Year of birth missing (living people)
Place of birth missing (living people)